Aggar, is a 2007 Indian Hindi romantic musical thriller film starring Udita Goswami in the lead role, features Tusshar Kapoor and Shreyas Talpade. It has been produced by Narendra Bajaj and Shyam Bajaj and directed by Anant Mahadevan.

Plot
A woman discovers that, becoming attracted to the wrong man can have deadly consequences in this taut and tense thriller. Janvi (Udita Goswami) is a woman whose life would seem ideal on the surface: she runs a thriving business and is married to Dr Aditya Merchant (Shreyas Talpade), a psychiatrist.

But a faint air of discontent has begun to creep into her relationship, when Aryan Mehta (Tusshar Kapoor), joins Janvi's company. Aryan himself has issues as an angry outburst leads him to accidentally kill his cheating girlfriend. Janvi impulsively gets drawn into a relationship with Aryan to keep her sanity. But after her issues with her husband are resolved, she tries to break off the affair. Aryan, however, is not willing to give her up so easily, and his attraction to her soon becomes a dangerous obsession.

Cast
 Udita Goswami as Jhanvi Merchant 
 Tusshar Kapoor as Aryan Mehta, Jhanvi's love interest 
 Shreyas Talpade as Dr. Aditya Merchant, Jhanvi's husband
 Saadhika Randhawa as Radha
 Vikas Kalantri as Mihir Rao
 Nauheed Cyrusi as Ritu Chaudhary
 Sophie Choudry as Nisha Raval

Soundtrack 
The Soundtrack of the movie was composed by Mithoon, and the lyrics were by Sayeed Quadri.

References

External links
 
 Film Review

2007 films
2000s Hindi-language films
Indian romantic thriller films
Films scored by Mithoon
Films directed by Anant Mahadevan
Hindi-language thriller films